Something Bitchin' This Way Comes is the sole album by Lock Up, released in 1989. It is the first label-released album to feature Tom Morello.

The album was re-released in 1997 by Manifesto Records.

Track listing
 "Can't Stop the Bleeding" (Lock Up) – 4:11
 "Nothing New" (Grillo, Livingston) – 3:10
 "Punch Drunk" (Lock Up) – 3:37
 "Everywhere I Go It Looks Like Rain" (Grello, Grillo) – 4:14
 "24 Hour Man" (Lock Up) – 4:46
 "Don't Wanna Talk About It" (Lock Up) – 3:47
 "Half Man, Half Beast" (Lock Up) – 3:45
 "Tell Me When It's Over" (Lock Up) – 5:32
 "Kiss 17 Goodbye" (Grillo, Livingston)  – 4:14
 "Where the Sky Meets the Street" (Lock Up) – 3:19
 "Maniac" (Grillo, Morello) – 3:34
 "Peacekeeper" (Lock Up) – 3:47

Personnel
Lock Up
 Brian Grillo - lead and backing vocals, percussion, artwork
 Tom Morello - guitars, backing vocals
 Chris Beebe - bass, backing vocals
 Vince Ostertag - drums, backing vocals, percussion
Technical
Michael Barbiero, Steve Thompson - mixing
Kevin Reagan - art direction
Willy Mrasek - cover photography

References

1989 debut albums
Lock Up (American band) albums
Albums produced by Matt Wallace
Geffen Records albums